The mixed team event in the IBSF World Championships 2016 was held on 14 February 2016.

First introduced at the 2007 championships, the mixed team event consists of one run each of men's skeleton, women's skeleton, 2-man bobsleigh, and 2-women bobsleigh.

Results
The runs were started at 15:00.

References

Mixed team